The Grand dictionnaire universel du XIXe siècle (Great Universal Dictionary of the 19th Century), often called the Grand Larousse du dix-neuvième, is a French encyclopedic dictionary. It was planned, directed, published, and to a substantial degree written by Pierre Larousse, though he also relied on anonymous fellow contributors and though he died in 1875, before its completion. The publication of the Grand dictionnaire universel in 15 volumes of 1500 pages extended from 1866 to 1876. Two supplements were published in 1877 and 1890.

Description
Volumes 1–15, covering A-Z, were issued from 1866 to 1876. A supplement (Volume 16) was published in 1877, and a second supplement (Volume 17), in 1890. The Larousse firm also published further supplements in the form of a magazine called Revue encyclopédique (1891-1900) then Revue universelle (1900-1905).

Unlike Émile Littré's contemporary dictionary, the Grand Larousse is primarily an encyclopedia.  It is opinionated and has a distinctive and personal style.

One such instance of subjectivity appears regarding emperor Napoleon Bonaparte. For Pierre Larousse, what the Republic's general had done until the coup of 18 Brumaire was virtuous and glorious, but the coup and the subsequent rule of the consul and emperor were a tyrant's doings. Hence, the Grand Larousse du dix-neuvième had two entries: one for Bonaparte, Napoleon, who, according to the article, died on the 18 Brumaire (9 November 1799); and one for Napoleon referring to the consul and emperor. Though it is true that Napoleon Bonaparte "changed" his name to Napoleon I, he only did so at his crowning as emperor, not after the 18 Brumaire coup.

Nouveau Larousse illustré
The Nouveau Larousse illustré was an illustrated encyclopedia published 1897-1904 by Éditions Larousse and edited by Claude Augé. It was essentially a scaled-down, updated and more neutral version of the Grand Larousse du dix-neuvième.

See also
 Éditions Larousse
 Grand Larousse encyclopédique

References

External links

Digitized version on Gallica, the Bibliothèque nationale de France's digital collection.
A digitization project Includes much background material and bibliography on 19c French dictionaries and encyclopedias.  In French.
 Online copies of Grand dictionnaire universel du XIXe siècle at the Internet Archive:

Grand Dictionnaire universel du XIXe siecle, Larousse
Grand dictionnaire universel du XIXe siecle, Larousse
Éditions Larousse books
1866 books
19th-century encyclopedias